Ellis Methodist Episcopal Church, also known as Ellis Hollow Community Church, is a historic Methodist Episcopal church located at Ellis Hollow in Tompkins County, New York.  It was listed on the National Register of Historic Places in 1993.

The church was built in 1896.

It was deemed significant "as a representative example of late-nineteenth century ecclesiastical architecture in a small rural community. The small frame building features restrained Gothic-inspired motifs. The interior is laid out in an Akron Plan, a popular arrangement for Methodist churches in the late nineteenth century. This plan is characterized by a diagonal orientation, with a corner entrance, a radial arrangement of pews, an altar in the opposite corner, and movable partitions marking the connection between the sanctuary and an adjacent Sunday school wing, allowing for the expansion of the auditorium when necessary."

References

External links
Ellis Hollow Community Church website

Churches on the National Register of Historic Places in New York (state)
Churches completed in 1896
19th-century Methodist church buildings in the United States
Churches in Tompkins County, New York
National Register of Historic Places in Tompkins County, New York